Team Neotel was a South African UCI Continental cycling team that existed from 2007 until 2009.

Major wins
2008
Powerade Dome 2 Dome Cycling Spectacular, Nolan Hoffman
Stage 9 Tour de Korea, Nolan Hoffman
 National Time Trial Championships, James Lewis Perry
2009
Overall Tour de Korea, Roger Beuchat
Stage 1, Nolan Hoffman
Tour du Jura, Roger Beuchat

References

UCI Continental Teams (Africa)
Cycling teams established in 2008
Cycling teams disestablished in 2009
Cycling teams based in South Africa